Charles King Irwin (also Irvine; 30 March 1874 – 15 January 1960) was an eminent Irish clergyman in the middle third of the 20th century.

Born on 30 March 1874 into an eminent ecclesiastical family, he was ordained in 1898 and began his career with a curacy at Brantry, after which he was Vicar of Derrynoose and then Middletown. Promotion to be Archdeacon of Armagh followed in 1924, (his father, Charles King Irwin, also held that role) after which he was elevated to the episcopate as the Bishop of Limerick, Ardfert and Aghadoe. Like all Church of Ireland bishops he was awarded an honorary Doctorate of Divinity by Trinity College, Dublin. Translated to Down, Connor and Dromore in 1942. He relinquished the bishopric of Down and Dromore, but retained that of Connor when the diocese was split on 1 January 1945. He retired on 31 May 1956 and died on 15 January 1960.

References

1874 births
People educated at The Royal School, Armagh
Alumni of Trinity College Dublin
Archdeacons of Armagh
20th-century Anglican bishops in Ireland
Bishops of Limerick, Ardfert and Aghadoe
Bishops of Down, Connor and Dromore
Bishops of Connor
1960 deaths
Diocese of Limerick, Ardfert and Aghadoe